Comiziano is a comune (municipality) in the  Metropolitan City of Naples in  Italy,  Campania region, located about 30 km northeast of Naples.

Comiziano borders the following municipalities: Camposano, Casamarciano, Cicciano, Cimitile, Tufino.

References

Cities and towns in Campania